Marie Sneve Martinussen (born 30 December 1985) is a Norwegian politician.

She was elected representative to the Storting from the constituency of Akershus for the period 2021–2025, for the Red Party.

Martinussen graduated as economist from the University of Oslo.

References

1985 births
Living people
University of Oslo alumni
Akershus politicians
Red Party (Norway) politicians
Members of the Storting
21st-century Norwegian politicians